This is a list of English inventors and designers.

A
 Roma Agrawal, structural engineer who contributed to the design of The Shard building in London
Joseph Aspdin (1788–1855), Portland cement

B
Roger Bacon (1214–1292), magnifying glass
Edward Barber (1969– ), London 2012 Olympic Torch
 Julia Barfield (1952– ), architect who contributed to the design of the London Eye and the i360 observation tower in Brighton, England
Trevor Baylis (1937–2018), wind-up radio
Tim Berners-Lee (1955– ), World Wide Web

C
Margaret Calvert (1936– ), graphic designer who designed many of the road signs used throughout the United Kingdom
George Cayley (1773–1854), man-carrying glider, tension spoke wheels, hot air engine, continuous track "universal railway" vehicle propulsion system
 Imran Chaudhri (1973– ) invented the user interface and interactions of the iPhone, also worked on the Mac, iPod, iPad, Apple TV and Apple Watch
Terence Conran (1931–2020), Design Museum founder

D 
Rick Dickinson (c. 1957–2018), designer of early computers, the touch-sensitive keyboard, as well as the rubber keyboard of the ZX Spectrum

F
Michael Faraday (1791–1867), electric transformer
John Ambrose Fleming (1848–1945), vacuum diode
Tommy Flowers (1905–1998), Colossus computer, an early electronic computer
William Friese-Greene (1855–1921), cinematography

G
Kenneth Grange (1929– ), industrial design including the InterCity 125

H
John Harrison (1693–1776), marine chronometer
Rowland Hill (1795–1879), postage stamp
Frank Hornby (1863–1936), Meccano

I
Jonathan Ive (1967– ), Chief Design Officer of Apple Inc. and designer of many of Apple's products, including the MacBook Pro, iMac, MacBook Air, Mac mini, iPod, iPod Touch, iPhone, iPad, iPad Mini, Apple Watch and iOS

K
 Tom Karen (1926–2022), industrial designer who designed cars, bicycles, and radios in the 1970s
 Jock Kinneir (1917–1994), graphic designer who designed many of the road signs used throughout the United Kingdom

M
George William Manby (1765–1854), fire extinguisher
 David Marks, architect who contributed to the design of the London Eye and the i360 observation tower in Brighton, England

N
Isaac Newton (1642–1727), reflecting telescope

O
Jay Osgerby (1969– ), London 2012 Olympic Torch

P
Alexander Parkes (1831–1890), celluloid
Stephen Perry, rubber band
Joseph Priestley (1733–1804), soda water
Philip Thorpe Priestley (1936-2018), inventor in thermometric reaction instrumentation

R 
Andrew Ritchie (1947– ), Brompton bicycle

S
Henry Shrapnel (1761–1842), shrapnel shell ammunition

T
J.J. Thomson (1856–1940), mass spectrometer
Jethro Tull (1674–1740), horse-drawn seed drill

W
Barnes Wallis (1887–1979), bouncing bomb
Edward Weston (1850–1936), Weston cell
Frank Whittle (1907–1996), co-inventor of the jet engine
William Winlaw (d.1796), patented agricultural machinery
Arthur Wynne (1862–1945), inventor of crossword puzzle

See also
List of British innovations and discoveries
List of Cornish engineers and inventors
List of Cornish scientists
List of English inventions and discoveries
List of Welsh inventors

References

Further reading

External links
 The Brits Who Designed the Modern World Artsnight - Series 4: 7, BBC Two

Inventors
Lists of inventors
English designers
Inventors